Köstebekgiller (English: The Mole family) is a Turkish live-action/computer animated children's television series that airs on the TRT Çocuk broadcast channel.

Premise 
In the garden of a house in Istanbul lives a family of moles called the Köstelbeks. The family consisting of Dede the grandfather, Baba the father, Anne the mother, Boyo, Süslü and Bebi. One time, a human girl named Pelin first meets her neighbor Caner who is a naughty boy, he and Pelin don't get along from the first moment. Caner treats Pelin badly, so she wants to stay away from him.

Cast

Real characters 
 İnci Türkay - Ceyda
 Ali Nuri Türkoğlu - Gölge
 Jess Molho - Profesör Fikri Güzel
 Reyhan Asena Keskinci - Pelin
 Yiğit Ege Yazar - Caner
 Orhan Aydın - Salih
 Emel Çölgeçen - Eda
 Gözde Kısa - Müjde
 Oğuz Oktay - Aslan Dede
 Can Bartu Aslan - Volkan

Animated characters 
 Ezel Kalkan (Voice) - Köstebek Anne
 Hakan Akın (Voice) - Köstebek Baba
 Ahmet  Abasıyank (Voice) - Köstan Amca
 Hüseyin  Ozay (Voice) - Köstebek Dede
 Ali Mehmet (Voice) - Kösteban
 Mustafa Oral (Voice) - Boyocan
 Gizem Gülen (Voice) - Süslü & Bebi

Turkish animated television series
2010 Turkish television series debuts
2010s animated television series
Turkish Radio and Television Corporation original programming
Television shows set in Istanbul
Television series produced in Istanbul
2018 Turkish television series endings